Antonio Cicco da Pontecorvo (died 21 April 1477) was a Roman Catholic prelate who served as Bishop of Caserta (1459–1477).

Biography
Antonio Cicco da Pontecorvo was ordained a priest in the Order of Friars Minor.  On 5 November 1459, he was appointed Bishop of Caserta by Pope Pius II. He served as Bishop of Caserta until his death on 21 April 1477.

Episcopal succession

References 

15th-century Italian Roman Catholic bishops
Bishops appointed by Pope Pius II
1477 deaths
Franciscan bishops